Gordon Ivan "Gifi" Fields (born June 1951) is a British fashion designer and businessman. He is a co-founder of the British Fashion Council and one of the creators of the rah-rah skirt.

Biography
After leaving school at the age of 16, Gifi Fields founded a succession of fashion labels. In 1968, he founded Ragfreak Clothing, which closed in 1971 when he founded Gingernut. When that closed in 1975, he opened Coppernob the following year. He was a co-founder of the British Fashion Council in 1983, the same year he founded Snob, which operated until 1987.

During the early part of his career, he designed for shops such as Bloomingdales, Harvey Nichols and Harrods. When Top Shop began featuring the work of individual designers/brands, he was in the first group of six alongside Jeff Banks, Stirling Cooper, Alice Pollock's Quorum, Miss Mouse and French Connection. Alongside Angela Stone, he was one of the creators of the Rah-rah skirt.

In 2015, Fields launched plus-size clothing retailer Scarlett & Jo. In the first year of business, it was nominated in four categories at the British Plus-Sized Awards, while Fields was nominated for best person in business. Rather than having dedicated shops, the brand is sold through other retailers such as Yours and Evans.

References

Living people
British fashion designers
1951 births